Löhr is a German surname. Notable people with the surname include:

Alexander Löhr (1885–1947), Austrian Luftwaffe commander
Dieter Löhr (born 1936), German fencer and Olympics competitor
George Augustus Löhr (1821–1897), English organist and composer; father of Richard Harvey Löhr
Richard Harvey Löhr (1856–1927), English composer; son of George Augustus Löhr
Hannes Löhr (1942–2016), German footballer and manager
Hermann Löhr (1871–1943), English composer; son of Frederic Nicholls Löhr
Frederic Nicholls Löhr (1844–1888), English composer; father of Hermann Löhr
Stefanie Löhr (born 1979), German footballer

See also
Loehr (surname)
Loher (disambiguation)
Lohr (disambiguation)

German-language surnames